"Wind Up Workin' in a Gas Station" is the opening song on Frank Zappa's 1976 album Zoot Allures. The song contains a fake German accent from Zappa as a result of Zappa's fascination with the German culture. In concert, the extensive repetition of the lines "Show me your thumb if you're really dumb" was given the response by the  audience members putting both thumbs firmly in the air. Despite the lyrics being pessimistic, the song became a fan favorite. A live version can be found on You Can't Do That on Stage Anymore, Vol. 6.

Meaning

The song attacks the American school system explaining that even with the highest education, many people will still end up with low pay jobs such as working at a gas station. The "show me your thumb" lines are believed to be a reference to a Gulf gasoline commercial from the 1960s.

Personnel

Musicians
 Frank Zappa – guitar, bass, lead vocals, synthesizer 
 Terry Bozzio – drums
 Davey Moiré – lead vocals, backing vocals

Production staff
 Arnie Acosta – mastering
 Amy Bernstein – layout design
 Michael Braunstein – engineer
 Bob Stone – digital remastering

References

Frank Zappa songs
Songs about occupations
Songs written by Frank Zappa
1976 songs
Song recordings produced by Frank Zappa